The Constellation Awards were a set of Canadian awards given annually for the best science fiction or fantasy works and achievements of the previous year. The event was founded in 2007. Constellation Awards are the only Canadian sci-fi award where the Canadian public select the nominees and winners in all categories. The awards were held at Toronto area hotels every year, but attendance and interest declined over time and the annual awards ended in 2014, which remains to date the last year the awards were held. The awards were run by the TCON Promotional Society, a not-for-profit organization that also ran several other Toronto-area fan events including the Toronto Trek, Polaris, Polar Chill, and Reversed Polarity fan conventions.

Categories

Television
Best Male Performance in a Science Fiction Television Episode
Best Female Performance in a Science Fiction Television Episode
Best Science Fiction Television Series of the year

Film/TV Movie/Mini-Series
Best Male Performance in a Science Fiction Film, TV Movie, or Mini-Series
Best Female Performance in a Science Fiction Film, TV Movie, or Mini-Series
Best Science Fiction Film, TV Movie, or Mini-Series of the year

Other
Best Technical Accomplishment in a Science Fiction Film or Television Production
Best Overall Science Fiction Film or Television Script
Outstanding Canadian Contribution to Science Fiction Film or Television in the year

Winners

Events

Constellation Awards 2007

Constellation Awards 2007 took place on 7 July in the Plaza Ballroom of the Doubletree International Plaza Hotel. Its hosts were Ed the Sock and Liana K.

Constellation Awards 2008
Constellation Awards 2008 took place on 12 July in the Plaza Ballroom of the DoubleTree by Hilton - Toronto Airport Hotel. Its host was Rick Green. This year Doctor Who received six nominations, Supernatural, Stargate and Smallville also had multiple nominations.

Constellation Awards 2009
The event was in the Grand York Ballroom of the Sheraton Parkway Toronto North Hotel on 11 July. Its host was actress Karen Cliche.

Constellation Awards 2010
The event was in Grand York Ballroom of the Sheraton Parkway Toronto North Hotel on 17 July. Its host was Gavin Stephens.

Constellation Awards 2011
The 2011 Constellation Awards's hosts were Teddy Wilson & Ajay Fry. It took place in Sheraton Parkway Hotel in Toronto.

Constellation Awards 2012
In 2012 Robin Dunne hosted the ceremony in the Sheraton Parkway Hotel in Toronto. Stargate Universe won five from the six awards it was nominated.

Constellation Awards 2013
The 2013 Constellation Awards's hosts were Andrew Jackson and Ellen Dubin. It took place at the Holiday Inn Hotel & Suites Toronto/Markham in Toronto as Continuum won 3 of the four awards it was nominated for.

Constellation Awards 2014
The 2014 Constellation Awards were hosted by Rick Green again, on Saturday, July 5th, 2014, at the Holiday Inn Toronto International Airport.  It was the last time the awards were held.

See also

 Canadian television awards

References

External links
Constellation Awards, official website

Canadian science fiction awards
Canadian television awards
Canadian film awards
Awards established in 2007
2007 establishments in Canada